In mathematics, and more specifically matrix theory, the spread of a matrix is the largest distance in the complex plane between any two eigenvalues of the matrix.

Definition
Let  be a square matrix with eigenvalues . That is, these values  are the complex numbers such that there exists a vector  on which  acts by scalar multiplication:

Examples

For the zero matrix and the identity matrix, the spread is zero. The zero matrix has only zero as its eigenvalues, and the identity matrix has only one as its eigenvalues. In both cases, all eigenvalues are equal, so no two eigenvalues can be at nonzero distance from each other.
For a projection, the only eigenvalues are zero and one.
All eigenvalues of a unitary matrix  lie on the unit circle. Therefore, in this case, the spread is at most equal to the diameter of the circle, the number 2.
The spread of a matrix depends only on the spectrum of the matrix (its multiset of eigenvalues).

See also
 Field of values

References
 Marvin Marcus and Henryk Minc, A survey of matrix theory and matrix inequalities, Dover Publications, 1992, .  Chap.III.4.

Linear algebra
Matrix theory